The 1906–07 season was Manchester United's 15th season in the Football League.

First Division

FA Cup

Squad statistics

References

Manchester United F.C. seasons
Manchester United